Marlene Magdalena Schmitz-Portz (born 14 January 1938) is a German athlete. She competed in the women's high jump at the 1960 Summer Olympics.

References

External links
 

1938 births
Living people
Athletes (track and field) at the 1960 Summer Olympics
German female high jumpers
Olympic athletes of the United Team of Germany
People from Euskirchen
Sportspeople from Cologne (region)